Vrtače is a small settlement in the Municipality of Trebnje in eastern Slovenia. The area is part of the traditional region of Lower Carniola and is now included in the Southeast Slovenia Statistical Region.

References

External links

Vrtače at Geopedia

Populated places in the Municipality of Trebnje